The Ireland Funds are a global fundraising network for people of Irish ancestry and friends of Ireland, dedicated to raising funds to support programs of peace and reconciliation, arts and culture, education and community development throughout the island of Ireland.  The Funds exist in 12 countries around the world, the largest member of the network being The American Ireland Fund, and, after Atlantic Philanthropies, may be the second largest non-governmental donor to Irish causes. The global chairman of The Ireland Funds is Tony O'Reilly. They have raised over $550 million for worthy causes in Ireland and around the world.

History

The American Irish Foundation 
During his visit to Ireland in 1963, United States President John F. Kennedy joined with Irish President Éamon de Valera to form The American Irish Foundation. The mission of this organization was to foster connections between Americans of Irish descent and the country of their ancestry.

The Ireland Fund 
In 1976, Dr. Anthony J.F. O'Reilly (Sir Tony O'Reilly), former CEO of H.J. Heinz Co. (as well as a former Ireland rugby union player), created The Ireland Fund with friend and fellow Pittsburgh businessman Dan Rooney, owner of the Pittsburgh Steelers football team, who later served as the United States Ambassador to Ireland. With three goals, "Peace, Culture and Charity", The Ireland Fund appealed for support for Ireland and its people from all Americans, especially those of Irish descent.

Merger 
On St. Patrick's Day 1987, The Ireland Fund and the American Irish Foundation led by Arthur William Bourn Vincent  merged at a White House ceremony to form The American Ireland Fund and to become the world's largest private organization funding constructive change in Ireland, both in Northern Ireland and in the Republic of Ireland.

Chapters of The American Ireland Fund 
Over the following decade, The Ireland Funds formed a thriving fundraising network of chapters in additional cities across the United States as The American Ireland Fund including Boston, Chicago, Palm Beach, New York City, Dallas, Denver, San Francisco, San Diego, Philadelphia, New Jersey and Washington D.C.

International chapters 
In parallel with expansion within the USA, Ireland Funds were established in a range of countries, from Ireland itself to Canada (launched 1978), Australia (launched 1987), Great Britain (1988), France (1990), New Zealand (1992), Germany (1993), Japan (1993), Monaco (1998), China (1998) and Singapore (2009).

Global headquarters 
Shared world headquarters for The Ireland Funds were opened in Boston in 1994.

Today 
With over 100 events annually in 40 cities around the world, attended by 40,000 people, and raising over $550 million since 1976, The Ireland Funds is one of the largest non-governmental organizations helping Ireland.  It does most of its work by choosing and contributing to the work of other NGOs.

Although The American Ireland Fund remains the largest component of The Ireland Funds structure, there are also chapters in Australia, Canada, China, France, Germany, United Kingdom, Japan, Monaco, Singapore, New Zealand, and Ireland.

Organization 
The Ireland Funds have their world headquarters in Boston, with offices in New York, San Francisco, Dallas, Chicago, Washington D.C., Philadelphia, Toronto, Dublin, London and Sydney.

Publicity
The organisation has had an active website since 1996, with four major relaunches since then.

Governance and staffing 
The Ireland Funds are overseen by voluntary directors at various levels, and have regional and global staff. Each country or chapter has its own governance body, such as a Board of Directors, with operations led by a local regional or executive director.

References

External links 
 

Irish culture
 
Non-profit organisations based in the Republic of Ireland
Presidency of John F. Kennedy
Tony O'Reilly family
Irish-American culture
Irish-American history
Éamon de Valera